Parabat Express (Train no. 709/710) is an intercity train which runs between Dhaka (capital of Bangladesh) and Sylhet. Parabat Express has been considered one of the prestigious and luxurious trains since the inception of intercity train in Bangladesh in 1986. The train connects two important cities of Bangladesh.

History 

Parabat Express made its 1st inaugural run on 19 March 1986 with allocated train no. 709 (up)/710 (down). It was introduced as inter-city train which offers luxurious and fast service. The train starts from Dhaka Railway Station since its inauguration. Parabat express gets the priority on Bangladesh Railway network. It has fewer stops than other Dhaka-Sylhet express trains and halts only at prominent stations.

Schedule 
The train runs between Dhaka and Sylhet district while touching other districts like Kishoreganj, Brahmanbaria, Habiganj and Maulavibazar. It departs Kamalapur railway station at 06:20 AM (Bangladesh Standard Time) and arrives Sylhet at 01:00 PM. In return trip, it departs Sylhet at 03:45 PM and arrives Dhaka at 10:40 PM. Tuesday is the weekly holiday of this train.

Carriages 

The train currently runs with 16 PT Inka (Industri Kereta Api) made air-brake coaches. This coaches were introduced to the service on 2 September 2016. The train has eight chair car, two ac chair car, two non ac chair car, two guard brake with attached dining, one non ac cabin and one generator car. Prior to introducing Inka coaches, the train ran with old vacuum brake coaches. However, the train used to run with Iranian air-brake coaches in between 1998 and 2011. Later, due to maintenance problem, Iranian airbrake coaches were replaced with vacuum coaches in 2011.

Locomotive 
Parabat Express usually is hauled by a Class 2900 locomotive of Bangladesh Railway. However, sometimes because of rolling stock crisis it is hauled by a Class 2600 locomotive. The train needs an air-braked locomotive which is mandatory.

Stoppages 
 Dhaka Bimanbandor
 Bhairabbazar
 Brahmanbaria
 Azampur
 Noapara
 Shaistaganj
 Sreemangal
 Bhanugach
 Kulaura
 Baramchal (Proposed)
 Maizgaon

Passenger interest 
People usually travel Parabat Express for its punctual and fast service. The train has more AC carriages than any other Dhaka-Sylhet express trains. This attracts passengers who prefer luxurious travel experience. Furthermore, travelling by express allows its passenger to view scenic beauty of Sylhet division. One can enjoy trackside beautiful hills, tea gardens and rural lifestyle while travelling by Parabat Express.

Accident of Locomotive no. 2933  
Locomotive no. 2933 was one of the newest locomotives of Class 2900 which met fatal accident in Noyapara, Madhabpur upazila, Habiganj district on 7 October 2016. The locomotive caught fire soon after it derailed with Parabat Express near Noapara Railstation. The driver cab and electrical cabinet of the locomotive were destroyed in the fire, and the locomotive had to undergo heavy repairs.

References

External links

Named passenger trains of Bangladesh
Transport in Sylhet